"It Don't Matter to Me" is a song written by David Gates and originally recorded by the pop-rock group Bread, of which Gates was a member. It was a Top 10 hit in the U.S. and Canada.  In the U.S., it reached No.10 on the Billboard Hot 100 and No.7 on the Cash Box Top 100.  In Canada, "It Don't Matter to Me" spent two weeks at No.6, and is ranked as the 81st biggest hit of 1970.

"It Don't Matter to Me" was included on the group's 1969 debut LP rather than their second album from which the previous single, "Make It with You", was taken. The 1970 single release was a new version, different from the 1969 album cut.

Chart performance

Weekly charts

Year-end charts

References

External links
 

1970 singles
1969 songs
Bread (band) songs
Songs written by David Gates
Elektra Records singles